Seymour "Cy" Schindell (March 4, 1907 – August 24, 1948) was an American actor. He appeared in 37 Three Stooges short subjects, mostly as a heavy, though he was never credited in any Stooge shorts.

Career
Brooklyn-born Schindell was born Seymour Schindel in 1907. He was a former middleweight boxer with 19 fights from 1926 to 1928. Schindell also memorably played Chizzilini, a parody of Benito Mussolini, in the short I'll Never Heil Again.

In addition to his work in Three Stooges shorts, Schindell also appeared briefly in It's a Wonderful Life as the bouncer at Nick's, and made numerous film appearances playing mainly blue collar roles such as a truck driver, a butcher and a policeman.

Military service and illness
Schindell enlisted in the United States Marine Corps during the 1920s and returned to active service for World War II.

Schindell died on August 24, 1948, at age 41, and was buried at Los Angeles National Cemetery, Los Angeles, California. His final film appearance was in 1948's Three Stooges film Crime on Their Hands; heavy makeup was used to mask Schindell's cancer-ridden face.

Selected filmography

 Fugitive Lady (1934) - Man (uncredited)
 Murder in the Clouds (1934) - Man at Shooting Gallery (uncredited)
 Stranded (1935) - Bridge Worker (uncredited)
 The Farmer Takes a Wife (1935) - Fight Spectator (uncredited)
 Undersea Kingdom (1936, Serial) - Khan's Guardsman (uncredited)
 Fury (1936) - Townsman (uncredited)
 Bullets or Ballots (1936) - Bookie Who Throws Bag (uncredited)
 The Big Noise (1936) - Schmidt's Henchman (uncredited)
 Two-Fisted Gentleman (1936) - Mahoney
 Dizzy Doctors (1937, Short) - Dr. Arm's Assistant (uncredited)
 3 Dumb Clucks (1937, Short) - Wedding Guest (uncredited)
 I Promise to Pay (1937) - Cy (uncredited)
 Back to the Woods (1937, Short) - Indian (uncredited)
 It Can't Last Forever (1937) - Hansen's Second (uncredited)
 Cash and Carry (1937, Short) - Vault Guard (uncredited)
 The Perfect Specimen (1937) - Injured Boxer (uncredited)
 Boy of the Streets (1937) - Blackie's Henchman (uncredited)
 Wells Fargo (1937) - Minor Role (uncredited)
 The Buccaneer (1938) - Pirate (uncredited)
 Little Miss Roughneck (1938) - Prisoner (uncredited)
 When G-Men Step In (1938) - Phone Man (uncredited)
 Over the Wall (1938) - Shower Room Guard (uncredited)
 Prison Break (1938) - Party Waiter (uncredited)
 I Am the Law (1938) - Strong-Arm Hood at Lindsay's House (uncredited)
 You Can't Take It with You (1938) - Man (uncredited)
 Juvenile Court (1938) - Referee (uncredited)
 Hold That Co-ed (1938) - Policeman (uncredited)
 The Spider's Web (1938, Serial) - Cadman (uncredited)
 Mutts to You (1938, Short) - Policeman (uncredited)
 Hawk of the Wilderness (1938, Serial) - Three Pines (uncredited)
 The Little Adventuress (1938) - Performer (uncredited)
 Smashing the Spy Ring (1938) - Richards (uncredited)
 Three Little Sew and Sews (1939, Short) - Guard (uncredited)
 North of Shanghai (1939) - Mug
 Flying G-Men (1939, Serial) - Osborne (uncredited)
 The Lady and the Mob (1939) - Henchman Collecting Payment (uncredited)
 A Ducking They Did Go (1939, Short) - Fruit Vendor (uncredited)
 The Rookie Cop (1939) - Butch - Joey's Henchman (uncredited)
 Mandrake the Magician (1939, Serial) - Bank Henchman (uncredited)
 Missing Daughters (1939) - Mugg (uncredited)
 Behind Prison Gates (1939) - Convict (uncredited)
 Girl from Rio (1939) - Patron of Blue Bird Gardens (uncredited)
 Calling All Curs (1939, Short) - Tony - Dognapper (uncredited)
 Golden Boy (1939) - Fighter (uncredited)
 Those High Grey Walls (1939) - Convict (uncredited)
 A Woman Is the Judge (1939) - Mickey (uncredited)
 Beware Spooks! (1939) - Barker (uncredited)
 The Shadow (1940, Serial) - Streeter (uncredited)
 Rockin' thru the Rockies (1940, Short) - Indian (uncredited)
 Half a Sinner (1940) - Mugg (uncredited)
 Terry and the Pirates (1940, Serial) - Henchman Morgan (uncredited)
 Grandpa Goes to Town (1940) - Smokey
 Men Without Souls (1940) - Harry (uncredited)
 Nutty But Nice (1940, Short) - Butch - Kidnapper (uncredited)
 Millionaires in Prison (1940) - Red Vernon (uncredited)
 How High Is Up? (1940, Short) - Workman with Blake (uncredited)
The Secret Seven (1940) - Felton (uncredited)
 From Nurse to Worse (1940, Short) - Policeman (uncredited)
 The Leather Pushers (1940) - Referee (uncredited)
 Angels Over Broadway (1940) - Jack (uncredited)
 So You Won't Talk (1940) - Truck Driver (uncredited)
 The Green Archer (1940, Serial) - Darcy (uncredited)
 The Great Plane Robbery (1940) - Hood (uncredited)
 Mysterious Doctor Satan (1940, Serial) - Jake - Biplane Pilot [Ch. 2] (uncredited)
 Boobs in Arms (1940, Short) - Enemy Soldier (uncredited)
 The Face Behind the Mask (1941) - Benson
 The Devil Commands (1941) - Karl
 The Monster and the Girl (1941) - Henchman (uncredited)
 Knockout (1941) - Hawkins Fight Referee (uncredited)
 Penny Serenade (1941) - Elmer - the Bootlegger (uncredited)
 The Spider Returns (1941, Serial) - Henchman Brown [Ch. 1] (uncredited)
 I'll Never Heil Again (1941, Short) - Chizzilini (uncredited)
 The Iron Claw (1941, Serial) - Henchman Red (uncredited)
 No Greater Sin (1941) - Scaturo's Henchman (uncredited)
 Dick Tracy vs. Crime, Inc. (1941, Serial) - Plant Heavy 8 (uncredited)
 A Yank on the Burma Road (1942) - A Spinaldi Brother (uncredited)
 Jail House Blues (1942) - Prisoner (uncredited)
 Woman of the Year (1942) - Pinkie's Listener in Bar (uncredited)
 Spy Smasher (1942, Serial) - Raygun Thug's Henchman [Ch. 7] (uncredited)
 What's the Matador? (1942, Short) - Bullring Attendant (uncredited)
 Sunday Punch (1942) - Arena Worker (uncredited)
 Matri-Phony (1942, Short) - Guard (uncredited)
 Footlight Serenade (1942) - Bill's Cornerman in Fight Number (uncredited)
 The Talk of the Town (1942) - Townsman at Ballgame (uncredited)
 Wildcat (1942) - Bar Brawler (uncredited)
 Road to Morocco (1942) - Arab Waiter (uncredited)
 Life with Blondie (1945) - Mug (uncredited)
 Tarzan and the Leopard Woman (1946) - Leopard Man (uncredited)
 The Gentleman Misbehaves (1946) - Stagehand (uncredited)
 Uncivil War Birds (1946, Short) - Union Soldier (uncredited)
 Somewhere in the Night (1946) - Thug (uncredited)
 Monkey Businessmen (1946, Short) - Clarence—Nurse (uncredited)
 Gallant Journey (1946) - Celebrant in Field (uncredited)
 The Brute Man (1946) - Crowd Control Policeman (uncredited)
 It's a Wonderful Life (1946) - Nick's Bouncer (uncredited)
 Johnny O'Clock (1947) - Dealer (uncredited)
 Mr. District Attorney (1947) - Truck Driver (uncredited)
 Fright Night (1947, Short) - Moose (uncredited)
 A Likely Story (1947) - Criminal (uncredited)
 Copacabana (1947) - Bouncer (uncredited)
 The Secret Life of Walter Mitty (1947) - Taxicab Driver (uncredited)
 The Foxes of Harrow (1947) - Crew Member (uncredited)
 Nightmare Alley (1947) - Roustabout (uncredited)
 Sing a Song of Six Pants (1947, Short) - Hargan's Henchman (uncredited)
 All Gummed Up (1947, Short) - Man with Prescription (uncredited)
 My Wild Irish Rose (1947) - Man in Olympic Theatre Balcony (uncredited)
 Killer McCoy (1947) - Mariola's Henchman (uncredited)
 Shivering Sherlocks (1948) - Police Officer Jackson (uncredited)
 I'm a Monkey's Uncle (1948, Short) - Caveman Rival (uncredited)
 The Return of October (1948) - Court Bailiff (uncredited)
 Crime on Their Hands (1948, Short) - Muscles (uncredited)
 The Man from Colorado (1949) - Soldier at Dance (uncredited) (final film role)
 Rip, Sew and Stitch (1953, Short) - Hargan's Henchman (uncredited) (archive footage)
 Fling in the Ring (1955, Short) - Moose (uncredited) (archive footage)
 Of Cash and Hash (1955, Short) - Jackson (uncredited) (archive footage)
 Stone Age Romeos (1955, Short) - Caveman (uncredited) (archive footage)
 Hot Ice (1955, Short) - Muscles (uncredited) (archive footage)

References

External links

1907 births
1948 deaths
American male film actors
Burials at Los Angeles National Cemetery
Deaths from cancer in California
Jewish American male actors
20th-century American male actors
20th-century American comedians
20th-century American Jews